Cosmo Radio was a channel on Sirius XM Radio. The station launched on March 14, 2006 as a collaboration between SIRIUS Satellite Radio and Cosmopolitan magazine. The programs featured everything that Cosmopolitan offered like advice on sex, love, and relationships, beauty and fashion tips, celebrity news and music.

Programming on Cosmo Radio included interviews with Cosmopolitan's expert editors, including Editor in Chief Kate White, on everything from astrological predictions to snagging the man of your dreams. The shows also featured celebrity guests talking about their latest projects as well as readers sharing their own experiences.

Originally a Sirius-only channel, the channel was added to XM Satellite Radio on November 12, 2008.  It went off the air on October 25, 2013.

Off the air
In October, 2013, Cosmo Radio elected to no longer continue with its radio offering on Sirius XM.  The last day that Cosmo Radio was broadcast was Friday, October 25.

References

Sirius Satellite Radio channels
XM Satellite Radio channels
News and talk radio stations in the United States
Digital-only radio stations
Radio stations established in 2006
Radio stations disestablished in 2013
Defunct radio stations in the United States